Iammogapi Launa (born 16 September 1958) is a Papua New Guinean athlete. She competed in the women's heptathlon at the 1984 Summer Olympics and the 1988 Summer Olympics. She was the first woman to represent Papua New Guinea at the Olympics.

References

External links

1958 births
Living people
Athletes (track and field) at the 1984 Summer Olympics
Athletes (track and field) at the 1988 Summer Olympics
Papua New Guinean heptathletes
Olympic athletes of Papua New Guinea